A Show of Force is a 1990 American thriller drama film directed by Bruno Barreto. The film is based on events and theories surrounding the Maravilla Hill case in Puerto Rico adapted from Anne Nelson's book, Murder Under Two Flags.

Plot
In 1978, Kate Melendez (Amy Irving) is a television news reporter who investigates the mysterious deaths of two radical Puerto Rican activists. The government claims they were terrorists while others claim the two were merely student activists. Despite threats to her own life, Melendez investigates the deaths, gradually leading her to conclude that undercover American agents were responsible for framing the activists as terrorists, and then murdering them.

Cast

See also
 Cinema of Puerto Rico
 List of films set in Puerto Rico

References

External links
 
 
 
 

1990 films
1990s thriller drama films
American thriller drama films
Films scored by Georges Delerue
Films about journalists
Films directed by Bruno Barreto
Films set in Puerto Rico
Paramount Pictures films
American political thriller films
1990 drama films
Cockfighting in film
1990s English-language films
1990s American films